Balm may refer to:

Places 
Balm, Alberta, Canada
Balm, Meiringen, Bern, Switzerland
Balm bei Günsberg, Solothurn, Switzerland
Balm bei Messen, Solothurn, Switzerland
Balm, Florida, U.S.

Plants 
 Melissa (plant), or balm, a genus of perennial herbs
 Lemon balm (Melissa officinalis)
 Monarda, a genus of flowering plants, many species of which are known as bee balm
 Elsholtzia ciliata, or Vietnamese balm

Other uses
Liniment, a medicated topical preparation for application to the skin
BALM Paints, an Australian paint manufacturer taken over by Dulux

See also 
 Balm of Gilead (disambiguation)
 Balsam (disambiguation)